Strobilops is a genus of air-breathing land snails, terrestrial pulmonate gastropod mollusks in the family Strobilopsidae.

Species 
The genus Strobilops includes the following species:
 Strobilops aeneus Pilsbry - Bronze pinecone snail photo
 Strobilops hubbardi (A. D. Brown, 1861)
 Strobilops labyrinthicus (Say, 1817)
 Strobilops texasianus
 Strobilops sp. nov. 1

References

External links 
 http://www.discoverlife.org/mp/20q?search=Strobilops

Strobilopsidae
Taxonomy articles created by Polbot